Treasury of Archaic Names is a 1978 role-playing game supplement published by Judges Guild.

Contents
Treasury of Archaic Names is a collection of name-lists, keyed to percentile dice numbers so that the gamemaster can roll dice to generate random names.

Publication history
As Judges Guild grew, Bill Owen's time was strained between the company and his family travel business, so as a result Owen dissolved his partnership with Bob Bledsaw in March 1978. Owen effectively sold his shares to Bledsaw, though he remained on a consultancy contract for a few years so that Bledsaw could spread out the payment. During this time, Owen authored Judges Guild's Treasury of Archaic Names (1979) and prepared a few documents for Bledsaw, before leaving the company.

Early in 1999 Judges Guild, led by Bob Bledsaw, returned on the web and began selling original Judges Guild products.  Afterward Judges Guild took the same path as many other first-generation RPG publishers in the d20 age: they became a licensor, and their first partner was RPGRealms / QuickLinkInteractive. QLI reprinted just two books during the two years that they held the license — Dark Tower (2001) and The Treasury of Archaic Names (2001).

Reception
Steve Jackson reviewed Treasury of Archaic Names in The Space Gamer No. 33. Jackson commented that "Not much use to players who don't also referee. Recommended for referees who take their naming serious – it'll be worth the investment."

References

Judges Guild fantasy role-playing game supplements
Role-playing game supplements introduced in 1978